is a former Japanese football player.

Playing career
Harada was born in Hiroshima Prefecture on December 21, 1977. He joined Japan Football League (JFL) club Cosmo Oil Yokkaichi from Sanfrecce Hiroshima youth team in 1996. Although he played many matches, the club was disbanded end of 1996 season. In 1997, he moved to JFL club Seino Transportation. Although he played many matches, the club was disbanded again end of 1997 season. In 1998, he moved to JFL club Montedio Yamagata. Although the club was promoted to J2 League from 1999, he could not play many matches. He retired end of 1999 season.

Club statistics

References

External links

1977 births
Living people
Association football people from Hiroshima Prefecture
Japanese footballers
J2 League players
Japan Football League (1992–1998) players
Cosmo Oil Yokkaichi FC players
Seino Transportation SC players
Montedio Yamagata players
Association football forwards